Dean Herbert may refer to:

 Dean Herbert (footballer) (born 1956), Australian rules footballer
 Dean Herbert (developer), Australian software developer who created the game osu!

See also
 Dan Herbert